Bishop John Brewer (24 November 1929–10 June 2000) was the fourth Roman Catholic Bishop of Lancaster, England. He was ordained a priest in the Diocese of Shrewsbury, where he became Auxiliary Bishop on 28 July 1971.

Brewer became Coadjutor Bishop of Lancaster on 15 November 1983 and, upon the retirement of Brian Charles Foley, he became Bishop of Lancaster on 22 May 1985. He died of cancer, while still in office, on 10 June 2000 and was succeeded on 4 July 2001 by Patrick O'Donoghue.

External links
Roman Catholic Diocese of Lancaster

1929 births
2000 deaths
Deaths from cancer in England
Roman Catholic bishops of Lancaster
20th-century Roman Catholic bishops in England
English College, Rome alumni